Events from the year 1971 in France.

Incumbents
 President: Georges Pompidou 
 Prime Minister: Jacques Chaban-Delmas

Events
14 March – Municipal elections held.
21 March – Municipal elections held.
3 July – American singer Jim Morrison, lead singer of The Doors, dies from a heart attack in the bathtub of his Paris hotel room. He was 27 years old.
3 September – Four Power Agreement on Berlin is signed.
10 December – Renault unveils its new R5 model, a small three-door hatchback similar in concept to the recently launched Italian Fiat 127, which will go on sale in the new year.

Births

January to March
4 January – Sébastien Foucras, freestyle skier and Olympic medallist
17 January – Sylvie Testud, actress, writer and director
20 January – Catherine Marsal, road racing cyclist
2 February
Ludovic Auger, cyclist
Stéphane Pédron, soccer player
5 February – Michel Breistroff, NHL ice hockey player (d. 1996)
7 February – Emmanuel Curtil, actor
11 February – Christian Labit, rugby union player
15 February – Brigitte Guibal, slalom canoer and Olympic medallist
21 February – Pierre Raschi, rugby union player
26 February – Hélène Ségara, singer
28 February – Tristan Louis, author and internet entrepreneur
20 March – Stéphane Heulot, cyclist
29 March – Alexandre Brasseur, actor.

April to June
3 April – Emmanuel Collard, motor racing driver.
7 April – Guillaume Depardieu, actor.
8 April – Christophe Lamaison, international rugby union player.
9 April – Jérôme Dreyfus, judoka.
12 April – Christophe Moreau, cyclist.
13 April – Franck Esposito, swimmer.
16 April – Jean-Michel Bazire, Harness racing driver.
27 April – François Bégaudeau, journalist, novelist and actor
4 May – Sébastien Denis, hurdler.
8 May – Dominique Casagrande, soccer player.
11 May – Dominique Arribagé, soccer player.
15 May – Anthony Bancarel, soccer player.
24 May – Habib Sissoko, soccer player.
28 May
Isabelle Carré, actress.
Lilian Martin, soccer player.
5 June – Stéphane Clamens, sport shooter.
9 June – Jean Galfione, pole vaulter and Olympic gold medallist.
10 June – Bruno Ngotty, soccer player.
12 June
Félicia Ballanger, cyclist.
Jérôme Romain, athlete.
25 June – Sébastien Levicq, decathlete.
28 June
Fabien Barthez, international soccer player.
Guillaume de Fondaumière, video game designer.
Sébastien Gattuso, athlete.
29 June – Stéphan Bignet, triathlete.

July to September
21 July – Emmanuel Bangué, long jumper.
4 August – Christophe Mendy, boxer.
6 August – Stéphane Lecat, swimmer.
11 August – Djamel Bouras, judoka and Olympic gold medallist.
25 August – Louis-Karim Nébati, actor.
4 September – Lilian Laslandes, soccer player.
9 September – Francis Llacer, soccer player.
27 September – Cédric Penicaud, swimmer.
29 September – Lilian Nalis, soccer player.

October to December
1 October – Stéphane Breitwieser, art thief.
14 October – Frédéric Guesdon, cyclist.
26 October – Olivier Galzi, television journalist.
28 October 
Jimmy Algerino, soccer player.
Nicolas Ouédec, soccer player.
9 November – Sabri Lamouchi, soccer player.
16 November – Laurent Wolf, music producer and DJ.
19 November
Pascal Edmond, golfer.
Cécile Lignot-Maubert, hammer thrower.
24 November
Franck Avitabile, jazz pianist.
Stéphane Denève, conductor.
29 November – Olivier Quint, soccer player.
8 December – Stéphane Poulat, triathlete.
17 December – Antoine Rigaudeau, basketball player.
21 December – Matthieu Chedid, singer-songwriter.
28 December – Olivier Enjolras, soccer player.

Full date unknown
Sylvain Chauveau, musician and composer.
Nicolas Ghesquière, fashion designer.
Fabrice Hadjadj, writer and philosopher.
Olivier Manchion, musician.

Deaths

January to March
5 January – Émilienne Moreau-Evrard, hero of World War I and in French resistance during World War II (born 1898).
10 January – Coco Chanel, fashion designer (born 1883).
13 January – Henri Tomasi, composer and conductor (born 1901).
8 February – Louis Antoine, mathematician (born 1888).
26 February – Fernandel, actor (born 1903).
2 March – Rita Jolivet, actress (born 1884).
10 March – Jean Follain, author, poet and lawyer (born 1903).
31 March – Alfred Desenclos, composer (born 1912).

April to June
3 April – Jacques Ochs, artist, épée and foil fencer and Olympic gold medallist (born 1883).
11 April – Marcel Gromaire, painter (born 1892).
30 May – Marcel Dupré, organist, pianist and composer (born 1886).
5 June – André Trocmé, pastor who aided Jewish refugees (born 1901).
12 June – Jules Dewaquez, soccer player (born 1899).
25 June – Charles Vildrac, playwright and poet (born 1882).

July to September
10 July – Laurent Dauthuille, boxer (born 1924).
19 July – Arsène Roux, Arabist and Berberologist (born 1893).
27 July – Jacques Lusseyran, author (born 1924).
31 July – Michel Saint-Denis, actor, theatre director, and drama theorist (born 1897).
24 August – René Paul Raymond Capuron, botanist (born 1921).
30 August – Louis Armand, engineer (born 1905).
10 September – Roland de Vaux, priest and archaeologist (born 1903).

October to December
10 October – Philippe Hériat, novelist, playwright and actor (born 1898).
27 October – Charlotte de La Trémoille, noblewoman (born 1892).
16 November – Lucien Chopard, entomologist (born 1885).
15 December – Paul Lévy, mathematician (born 1886).

Full date unknown
Louis Lecoin, militant pacifist (born 1888).
André Lesauvage, sailor and Olympic gold medallist (born 1890).

References

Links

1970s in France